The Dresden Conference or the Conference of Dresden may refer to:

Conference of Dresden (1812), a gathering of European leaders called by Napoleon to prepare for the French Invasion of Russia
Dresden Conference (1851), a conference that affirmed Prussian recognition of the German Confederation